Kooba is a brand of contemporary handbags designed and owned by New York designer Abby Held.

History
The brand was launched in 1998 by the mother-daughter team of Bonnie and Abbe Held. Lynn Pincus joined them in 2000. 

In 2007, private equity firm Swander Pace Capital made an undisclosed investment in the company and is now the majority stake holder.

Products
The bags are often crafted from leather and are known for their signature shape, hardware, and variety of colors. Bags are often named after celebrities and other notable figures. One of the brand's best selling bags is the Sienna, named for actress Sienna Miller.

Bags range in price from $200 to $700
and are sold through high-end retailers such as Barneys New York, Henri Bendel, and Neiman Marcus.

In 2007, Kooba launched a collection of contemporary fall tops.
The brand also includes jackets and outerwear.

Authenticity
Because of the popularity of the Kooba brand and the high prices attached to their products, there is a significant amount of counterfeit merchandise produced and sold, some of which ends up on online retail and auction websites such as eBay. Authenticity can sometimes be determined by the presence of these characteristics:

Tags are two-sided and folded with a string connected in a corner
Certificate of Authenticity is included with each bag
No plastic on the handles

Kooba in popular culture
Celebrities who are known to own a Kooba handbag include actresses Jennifer Aniston, Sienna Miller and Kristen Bell, as well as singer Avril Lavigne.

Kooba bags appear on a number of television shows on the Bravo network including "The Fashion Show" and "NYC Prep." Kooba designed exclusive colors for its bags, and the cast members got to pick their favorite. The bags will be sold on Bravo's website.

References

External links
 Official Kooba site.

Bags (fashion)
Clothing companies of the United States
2000s fashion
Products introduced in 1998
Fashion accessory brands
Companies based in New York (state)